The Paulaya River is a river in Honduras.

Poyais Scheme
In 1822–1823, the river (under the name Rio Tinto/Black river) was at the centre of the fictional nation of Poyais invented by confidence trickster Gregor MacGregor. The town of Poyais, capital of this nation, was claimed to be on its banks.

See also
List of rivers of Honduras

References
Rand McNally, The New International Atlas, 1993.
CIA map: :Image:Honduras rel 1985.jpg
UN map: :Image:Un-honduras.png
Google Maps
Sketch of the Mosquito shore, 1822 
A map of Mosquitia and the territory of Poyais with the Adjacent Countries 

Rivers of Honduras